François Villette (1621- 1698) was an engineer, optician and fireworks expert at the court of Louis XIV of France. An early demonstrator of the potential of solar energy technology, he designed a tin-plated bronze mirror, almost one meter in diameter, which he used to reflect the sun’s rays onto objects which melted from the high temperatures produced. It was demonstrated with great effect at the court of Versailles.

References

Further reading
 Description du grand miroir ardent, fait par les sieurs Villette père et fils natifs de Lion avec quelques remarques sur les efets surprenans et admirables quIil produit. A Liege, Chez Guillaume Barnabe Imprimeur de son Altesse Serenissime Electorale, 1715, 16 pp. Digitized by Google from a book at the Austrian National Library (Österreichische Nationalbibliothek).

1621 births
1698 deaths
People associated with solar power
17th-century French inventors
17th-century French engineers